Tapi-class corvettes are a class of two corvettes that were built for the Royal Thai Navy in the early 1970s. Both ships remain in service.

Design and construction
For procurement purposes, they were allocated the US Navy hull numbers PF 107 and PF 108.

Two triple Mark 32 torpedo tubes for anti-submarine torpedoes and a Hedgehog anti-submarine mortar comprised the ships' anti-submarine armament. AN/SPS-6 air-search radar and SQS-17 sonar comprised the ships' sensor suite.

Operational history
The first ship, Tapi, was commissioned on 19 November 1971, with the second ship, Khirirat, following on 10 August 1974. Both ships were modernised during the 1980s, with the US 3-inch guns being replaced by a rapid fire OTO Melara 76 mm gun forward, and a Bofors 40mm/70 gun aft, with two single 20 mm cannon replaced the existing twin Bofors mount. The obsolete Hedgehog was removed, and the ships were fitted with new radar and sonar systems.

As of 2002, they were used for patrolling Thailand's Exclusive economic zone.

Units

References

Notes

Sources

Ships of the Royal Thai Navy
Corvette classes